A T-top (UK: T-bar) is an automobile roof with a removable panel on each side of a rigid bar running from the center of one structural bar between pillars to the center of the next structural bar. The panels of a traditional T-top are usually made of auto grade safety glass.

The removable panel roof was patented by Gordon Buehrig on June 5, 1951.   It was first used in a 1948 prototype by The American Sportscar Company or “Tasco.”

The 1968 Chevrolet Corvette coupe was the first  U.S.-built production automobile to feature a T-top roof.  This increased the popularity of the coupe, such that it outsold the convertible and later led to the discontinuation of the Corvette convertible after 1975 until it was revived in 1986. Post-C3 models were built with a targa top instead of a T-top.

Examples of traditional T-Top 

 Buick Regal (1978-1987)
 Chevrolet Corvette (1968–1982)
 Chevrolet Camaro (1978–2002)
 Chevrolet Monte Carlo
 Chrysler Cordoba
 Datsun 280ZX
 Dodge Daytona
 Dodge Magnum
 Dodge Mirada
 Ford Mustang (second and third generation)
 Ford Thunderbird (seventh generation)
 Mercury Capri
 Nissan NX
 Nissan 300ZX
 Nissan EXA
 Nissan URGE (concept)
 Pontiac Fiero
 Pontiac Firebird, incl. Trans Am (1976–2002)
 Pontiac Grand Prix
 Rover 200 Coupe (1992-1999)
 Oldsmobile Cutlass Supreme
 Suzuki X-90
 Subaru BRAT
 Subaru Vivio
 Toyota MR2 (AW11/SW20/SW21/SW22)

T-Top variations 
 Suzuki Cappuccino - has an optional solid roof which can be converted into a T-top
 Triumph Stag - has the underlying T-Top structure, but has a one piece, non-glass, roof panel which passes over the central front-to-back bar when in place.

See also 
 Cabrio coach
 Sunroof
 Targa top

References 

Automotive styling features